Camille Bedard (born December 1, 1933) was a Canadian professional hockey player who played 356 games in the  American Hockey League for the Providence Reds and Quebec Aces. He also played for the Trois-Rivieres Lions and Valleyfield Braves in the Quebec Hockey League, and in the Western Hockey League for the San Francisco Seals and Los Angeles Blades

External links
 

1933 births
Canadian ice hockey defencemen
Ice hockey people from Quebec
Living people
People from Alma, Quebec
Providence Reds players
Quebec Aces (AHL) players
San Francisco Seals (ice hockey) players
Trois-Rivières Ducs coaches
Trois-Rivières Lions (1955–1960) players
Canadian ice hockey coaches